The commune of Kayanza is a commune of Kayanza Province in northern Burundi. The capital lies at Kayanza.

References

Communes of Burundi
Kayanza Province